Modern Physics Letters B is a peer-reviewed scientific journal on physics, especially the areas of condensed matter, statistical and applied physics, and high-Tc superconductivity. It was established in 1987 and is published by World Scientific.

Related journals 
 Modern Physics Letters A

Abstracting and indexing 
The journal is abstracted and indexed in:
 Science Citation Index
 Materials Science Citation Index
 Current Contents/Physical, Chemical & Earth Sciences
 Astrophysics Data System
 Mathematical Reviews
 Inspec
 CSA Meteorological & Geoastrophysical Abstracts
 Scopus
According to the Journal Citation Reports, the journal has a 2020 impact factor of 1.668.

References

External links 
 

World Scientific academic journals
Physics journals
Publications established in 1987
English-language journals